Trevor Bennett (born 1926) is a Canadian politician in Newfoundland and Labrador

Trevor Bennett may also refer to:

 A fictional character in The Adventure of the Creeping Man, a 1923 Sherlock Holmes story by Sir Arthur Conan Doyle
 A trophy awarded by the Quebec Junior Football League